Collateral damage is any death, injury, or other damage inflicted that is an incidental result of an activity. Originally coined by military operations, it is now also used in non-military contexts.

Since the development of precision guided munitions in the 1970s, military forces often claim to have gone to great lengths to minimize collateral damage.

Critics of use of the term "collateral damage" see it as a euphemism that dehumanizes non-combatants killed or injured during combat, used to reduce the perceived culpability of military leadership in failing to prevent non-combatant casualties.

Collateral damage does not include civilian casualties caused by military operations that are intended to terrorize or kill enemy civilians (e.g., the bombing of Chongqing during World War II).

Etymology
The word "collateral" comes from medieval Latin word collateralis, from col-, "together with" + lateralis (from latus, later-, "side" ) and is otherwise mainly used as a synonym for "parallel" or "additional" in certain expressions (e.g. "collateral veins" meaning veins running parallel to each other, or "collateral security" meaning security additional to the main obligation in a contract).

The oldest known usage of the term "collateral damage" in this context occurred in an article written in May 1961 by T. C. Schelling entitled "DISPERSAL, DETERRENCE, AND DAMAGE". The term "collateral damage" likely originated as a euphemism during the Vietnam War referring to friendly fire or to the intentional killing of non-combatants and destruction of their property.

Criticism of the phrase
During the 1991 Gulf War, Coalition forces used the phrase to describe the killing of civilians in attacks on legitimate military targets. According to Scottish linguist Deborah Cameron, "the classic Orwellian arguments for finding this usage objectionable would be that
 it is jargon, and to the extent that people cannot decode it, it conceals what is actually going on;
 it is a euphemism; abstract, agentless, and affectless, so that even if people succeeded in associating it with a real act or event, they would be insulated from any feelings of repulsion or moral outrage".

In 1999, "collateral damage" was named the German Un-Word of the Year by a jury of linguistic scholars. With this choice, it was criticized that the term had been used by NATO forces to describe civilian casualties during the Kosovo War, which the jury considered to be an inhuman euphemism.

International humanitarian law
Military necessity, along with distinction and proportionality, are three important principles of international humanitarian law, governing the legal use of force in an armed conflict. Offensives causing collateral damage are not automatically classed as a war crimes. They are war crimes when the objective is excessively or solely collateral damage.

Luis Moreno-Ocampo, Chief Prosecutor at the International Criminal Court, investigated allegations of war crimes during the 2003 invasion of Iraq and published an open letter containing his findings. A section titled "Allegations concerning War Crimes" elucidates this usage of military necessity, distinction, and proportionality:
{{blockquote|Under international humanitarian law and the Rome Statute, the death of civilians during an armed conflict, no matter how grave and regrettable, does not in itself constitute a war crime. International humanitarian law and the Rome Statute permit belligerents to carry out proportionate attacks against military objectives,<ref>Article 52 of Additional Protocol I to the Geneva Conventions provides a widely accepted definition of military objective: "In so far as objects are concerned, military objectives are limited to those objects which by their nature, location, purpose or use make an effective contribution to military action and whose total or partial destruction, capture or neutralization, in the circumstances ruling at the time, offers a definite military advantage" (Source: Luis Moreno-Ocampo References page 5, footnote 11).</ref> even when it is known that some civilian deaths or injuries will occur. A crime occurs if there is an intentional attack directed against civilians (principle of distinction) (Article 8(2)(b)(i)) or an attack is launched on a military objective in the knowledge that the incidental civilian injuries would be clearly excessive in relation to the anticipated military advantage (principle of proportionality) (Article 8(2)(b)(iv).

Article 8(2)(b)(iv) criminalizes intentionally launching an attack in the knowledge that such attack will cause incidental loss of life or injury to civilians or damage to civilian objects or widespread, long-term, and severe damage to the natural environment which would be clearly excessive in relation to the concrete and direct overall military advantage anticipated.

Article 8(2)(b)(iv) draws on the principles in Article 51(5)(b) of the 1977 Additional Protocol I to the 1949 Geneva Conventions, but restricts the criminal prohibition to cases that are "clearly" excessive. The application of Article 8(2)(b)(iv) requires, inter alia, an assessment of:
 the anticipated civilian damage or injury
 the anticipated military advantage
 whether (a) was "clearly excessive" in relation to (b).}}

U.S. military approach
The USAF Intelligence Targeting Guide defines the term as the "unintentional damage or incidental damage affecting facilities, equipment, or personnel, occurring as a result of military actions directed against targeted enemy forces or facilities", stating that "[s]uch damage can occur to friendly, neutral, and even enemy forces". Another United States Department of Defense document uses "[u]nintentional or incidental injury or damage to persons or objects that would not be lawful military targets in the circumstances ruling at the time", which also states that "[s]uch damage is not unlawful so long as it is not excessive in light of the overall military advantage anticipated from the attack."

In U.S. military terminology, the unintentional destruction of allied or neutral targets is called "friendly fire".

The U.S. military follows a technology-based process for estimating and mitigating collateral damage. The software used is known as "FAST-CD" or "Fast Assessment Strike Tool—Collateral Damage."

Non-military uses of the phrase
While not actually invented by the military, this has been common. However, the term has since been widely adopted for non-military cases, and in particular, the COVID-19 pandemic. A large number of medical, government sources and media use this term widely in relation to deaths caused indirectly as a result of government policy such as lockdowns, and not directly by the virus itself. Significant debate on the pandemic strategy has ensued, with some advocating restrictions such as lockdowns to save lives, where others claim the 'collateral damage' caused by enforced lockdowns, masks and distancing may in fact cause more deaths over a longer term. An example is the Great Barrington Declaration, purportedly signed by 3500 medical and other professionals (and mentioned in UK parliament and media) has a FAQ page titled 'Lockdowns and collateral damage', and refers to this phrase several times.

The term has also been borrowed by the computing community to refer to the refusal of service to legitimate users when administrators take blanket preventative measures against some individuals who are abusing systems. For example, Realtime Blackhole Lists used to combat email spam generally block ranges of Internet Protocol (IP) addresses rather than individual IPs associated with spam, which can deny legitimate users within those ranges the ability to send email to some domains.

The related term collateral mortality'' is also becoming prevalent, and probably derives from the term collateral damage. It has been applied to other spheres in addition to a military context. Fisheries are an example of this, where bycatch of species such as dolphins are called collateral mortality; they are species that die in the pursuit of the legal death of fishing targets, such as tuna.

See also
Accidental death
Legitimate military target
Roadkill
Principles of war
Unintended consequences

References

External links

 
 USAF Intelligence Targeting Guide – Attachment 7: Collateral Damage
 
 
 The Faces of "Collateral Damage" by Charlie Clements, Friends Journal, April 2003
 "Collateral Damage: A Military Euphemism for Murder" by Camillo Mac Bica, Znet, 16 April 2007

Military terminology
Linguistic controversies
Euphemisms
War casualties
Civilian casualties